Chéronnac is a commune in the Haute-Vienne department, in the Nouvelle-Aquitaine region, western France.

Geography
At Chéronnac is the source of the river Charente.

Inhabitants are known as Chéronnacais.

The village holds an Oyster Festival every 4 years where chariots carrying oysters are taken through the village.

See also
 Rochechouart impact structure
 Communes of the Haute-Vienne department

References

Communes of Haute-Vienne